Aeternus is a Norwegian blackened death metal band from Bergen. It was formed in 1993 as an idea of Ronny Hovland, calling himself Ares, and Erik Heggernes, a.k.a. Vrolok. Later in 1996 Nicola Trier, a.k.a. Morrigan, joined the duo as a bass player, forming the core trio that created the band's first two albums. Morrigan also created the logo picture of ravens and axes that still exists as one of the band's trademarks.

History
For the first two albums, the band called their own style "Dark Metal". They released their debut album, Beyond the Wandering Moon, in 1997 on Hammerheart Records (now Karmageddon Media), and toured that year with black metal bands Emperor and Limbonic Art through Europe. Their second album, ...And So the Night Became was released in 1998, accompanied by a tour supporting Deicide, and was later re-released in several different formats.

In 1999, they added guitarist Radek, and their sound moved from darkened black metal toward a faster and more aggressive death metal sound for 1999's Shadows of Old. Morrigan left the group in 2001 for personal reasons and was later replaced by V'gandr, head of the Norwegian Viking metal band Helheim. Later that year they released their fourth full-length album called Ascension of Terror and did some live shows. They then departed from Hammerheart Records and also split way with guitarist Radek. Their next album A Darker Monument was released on the new Nocturnal Art Productions label in 2003. After the release of their sixth full-length HeXaeon, long-time member Vrolok left the band and was replaced by S. Winter on drums early in 2006. The group toured Europe later that year to support their new album. In September 2007, S. Winter was no longer in the group.

In the period between 2008 and 2011, the band entered a lull. V'gandr left the band to concentrate his work on his own band Helheim and continued to be a session member at Norwegian black metal band Taake. Ares reformed the band with Phobos on drums and new guitarist Specter. Soon the work for a new album began. In the current line-up they were back on stage in 2013 and released their seventh  album, ...And the Seventh His Soul Detesteth.

Members

Current
Ares – vocals, guitar (1993–present)
Gorm – guitar (2019–present)
Eld – bass (2013–present)
Phobos – drums (2007–present)

Former
Lava – guitar (1999–2004)
Stanley – guitar (2004–2005)
Dreggen – guitar (2005–2010)
Ørjan – bass (1993–1996)
Morrigan – bass, keyboards (1996–2001)
V'gandr – bass (2001–2012)
Vassago Rex – Drums (1993)
Vrolok – Drums (1993–2006)
S. Winter – Drums (2006–2007)
Specter – guitar (2010–2017)

Timeline

Discography
Walk My Path (Demo, 1994)
Dark Sorcery (EP, View Beyond Records, 1995; re-released on Hammerheart Records, 1997)
Beyond the Wandering Moon (Hammerheart, 1997)
...And So the Night Became (Hammerheart, 1998)
Dark Rage (7-inch EP, 1998)
Shadows of Old (Hammerheart, 2000)
Burning the Shroud (EP, Martyr Records/Hammerheart, 2001)
Ascension of Terror (Martyr, 2001)
Demo 2002 (Demo, 2002)
A Darker Monument (Candlelight Records, 2003)
HeXaeon (Karisma Records/Dark Essence Records, 2006)
...And the Seventh His Soul Detesteth (Dark Essence Records) (2013)
Heathen (Dark Essence Records, 2018)

References

External links 

 

Norwegian death metal musical groups
Musical groups established in 1993
1993 establishments in Norway
Musical quartets
Musical groups from Bergen